Independência Futebol Clube, commonly known as Independência, is a Brazilian association football club based in Rio Branco, Acre. The club currently doesn't play in any league, having last participated in the Campeonato Acreano in the 2019 season.

Independência Futebol Clube's home kit is a shirt with green, white and red vertical stripes, white shorts and white socks. They play their home matches at the Estádio José de Melo which has a capacity of 8,000 and they are currently playing in the Campeonato Acriano which they have won 10 times. This makes them the 3rd most successful team in the league's history.

History
Independência Futebol Clube was founded on August 2, 1946 by a group of entrepreneurs from Rio Branco.

Honours

Domestic

State 

 Campeonato Acreano:

 Winners (11): 1954, 1958, 1959, 1963, 1970, 1972, 1974, 1985, 1988, 1993, 1998
 Runners-up (16): 1950, 1951, 1955, 1956, 1957, 1960, 1966, 1969, 1971, 1980, 1982, 1984, 1992, 1997, 1999, 2000

 Campeonato Acreano Segunda Divisão:

Winners (1): 2018
 Runners-up (1): 2014

References

External links
 Independência Futebol Clube at Arquivo de Clubes

Inactive football clubs in Brazil
Association football clubs established in 1946
Football clubs in Acre (state)
1946 establishments in Brazil